This is the discography of American rapper Lil B.

Albums

Studio albums

Extended plays

Collaboration albums

Instrumental albums

Mixtapes

Compilation mixtapes

Singles

As lead artist

Guest appearances

References

Hip hop discographies
Discographies of American artists